Kuznetsov, Kuznyetsov, Kuznetsoff, or Kouznetsov (masculine) or Kuznetsova (feminine) is the third most common Russian surname, an equivalent of the English "Smith" (derived from a Russian word kuznets that means blacksmith).

Men
Aleksandr Kuznetsov (disambiguation), several people
Aleksey Kuznetsov (disambiguation), several people

Artists and entertainers
Aleksey Alekseevich Kuznetsov (born 1941), Soviet/Russian jazz guitarist and composer
Anatoly Borisovich Kuznetsov (1930–2014), Soviet/Russian actor
Anatoly Vasilievich Kuznetsov (1929–1979), Soviet writer, author of Babi Yar
I. Kuznetsov, Russian soloist with the Alexandrov Ensemble
Ivan Sergeyevich Kuznetsov (1867–1942), Russian architect
Mikhail Kuznetsov (actor) (1918–1986), Soviet actor
Nikolai Dmitriyevich Kuznetsov (1850–1929), Ukrainian portrait painter
Pavel Varfolomevich Kuznetsov (1878–1968), Russian painter
Sergey Kuznetsov, (born 1966), Russian writer
Yury Kuznetsov, (born 1946), Russian actor 
Andy Kusnetzoff (born 1970), Argentine TV and radio personality

In sports
Alex Kuznetsov (born 1987), Ukrainian-American male tennis player
Andrey Kuznetsov (born 1991), Russian male tennis player
Artur Kuznetsov (Russian footballer) (born 1972)
Artur Kuznetsov (Ukrainian footballer) (born 1995)
Dmitri Kuznetsov (footballer born 1965), association football coach and former player
Dmitri Anatolyevich Kuznetsov (born 1972), retired Russian footballer
Evgeny Kuznetsov (born 1992), Russian ice hockey player
Evgeny Kuznetsov (diver) (born 1990), Russian diver
Maxim Kuznetsov (born 1977), Russian ice hockey player
Mikhail Kuznetsov (figure skater) (born 1988), Russian figure skater
Mikhail Kuznetsov (triathlete) (born 1971), Kazakhstani triathlete
Oleh Kuznetsov (born 1963), Ukrainian footballer and manager
Ruslan Kuznetsov (born 1980), Russian para-cyclist
Pavel Kuznetsov (weightlifter), (born 1961), Russian weightlifter
Syarhey Kuznyatsow, (born 1979), Belorussian footballer
Serhiy Kuznetsov (footballer born 1982), Ukrainian footballer
Vasili Kuznetsov (athlete) (1932–2001), Soviet decathlete
Vasili Kuznetsov (footballer) (born 1978), Russian footballer
Viktor Kuznyetsov (athlete) (born 1986), Ukrainian athlete
Viktor Kuznetsov (footballer, born 1949) (born 1949), Soviet international footballer
Viktor Kuznetsov (swimmer) (born 1961), Soviet backstroke swimmer
Vitali Kuznetsov (footballer) (born 1986), Russian footballer
Vitali Kuznetsov (judoka) (1941–2011), Soviet judoka

In politics
Alexey Kuznetsov (1905–1950), Soviet politician
Eduard Kuznetsov (dissident) (born 1939), Jewish Soviet dissident and human rights activist
Eduard Kuznetsov (politician) (born 1967), Russian politician
Vasili Kuznetsov (politician) (1901–1990), Soviet politician
Vyacheslav Nikolayevich Kuznetsov (born 1947), Belarusian politician

In the military
Fyodor Kuznetsov (1898–1961), Soviet military leader 
Nikolai Gerasimovich Kuznetsov (1904–1974), Admiral of the Fleet of the Soviet Union
Nikolai Ivanovich Kuznetsov (1911–1944), Soviet intelligence agent and partisan 
Vasily Kuznetsov (general) (1894–1964), Soviet military leader and Hero of the Soviet Union
Yuri Viktorovich Kuznetsov (1946–2020), Soviet military leader and Hero of the Soviet Union

In science and engineering
Alexander Kuznetsov (mathematician) (born 1973), Russian mathematician
Pobisk Georgievich Kuznetsov (1924-2000), Soviet Russian philosopher and scientist
Nikolai Dmitriyevich Kuznetsov (1911–1995), Soviet aerospace engineer and the chief of the Kuznetsov Design Bureau
Nikolai Yakovlevich Kuznetsov (1873–1948), Russian entomologist, paleoentomologist and physiologist
Nikolay V. Kuznetsov (born 1979), Russian scientist, specialist in nonlinear dynamics and control theory
Yuri A. Kuznetsov, Russian-American mathematician

In other areas
Boris Kuznetsov (lawyer) (born 1944), Russian lawyer
Pyotr Kuznetsov (born 1964), Russian religious leader

Women

Artists and entertainers 
Agniya Kuznetsova (born 1985), Russian theatre and film actress
Dina Kuznetsova, American lyric dramatic operatic soprano
Lyubov Kuznetsova (born 1928), Russian calligrapher and font designer
Maria Kouznetsova (violinist) (born 1991), Russian violinist
Maria Kuznetsova (novelist), Ukrainian American novelist
Mariya Kuznetsova (born 1950), Russian actress in 2001 film Taurus
 Mariya Kuznetsova (singer) (1880–1966), Russian opera singer and dancer
 Marina Kuznetsova (1925–1996), Soviet stage and film actress
 Vera Kuznetsova (1907—1994) was a Russian film actress

In sports 
Alesya Kuznetsova (born 1992), Russian judoka
Elena Kuznetsova (born 1982), Uzbekistani sport shooter
Evgeniya Kuznetsova (born 1980), former Olympic gymnast who competed for Russia and later Bulgaria
Galyna Kuznetsova (born 1960), Ukrainian Paralympic volleyball player
Maria Kuznetsova (wrestler) (born 1997), Russian wrestler
Nataliya Kuznetsova (born 1991), Russian powerlifter and bodybuilder
Olga Kuznetsova (born 1967), Russian middle distance runner
Olga Kuznetsova (sport shooter) (born 1968), Russian sport shooter
Polina Kuznetsova (born 1987), Russian handball player
Svetlana Kuznetsova (born 1985), Russian tennis player
Svetlana Kuznetsova (basketball) (born 1965), Russian basketball player
Svetlana Kuznetsova (cyclist) (born 1995), Russian cyclist
Yelena Kuznetsova (born 1977), Kazakhstani race walker
Yevgeniya Kuznetsova (athlete) (born 1936), Soviet athlete, competed in discus throwing in 1960 and 1964 Olympics

In politics 
Anna Kuznetsova (born 1982), Russian human rights activist
Irina Davydovna Kuznetsova (born 1923), Soviet-Latvian politician

In business 
Inna Kuznetsova (born 1968), CEO of 1010data

In science and engineering 
 Irina Levshakova (née Kuznetsova) (1959–2016), Soviet/Russian paleontologist and artist
 Valentina Kuznetsova (1937–2010), Soviet and Russian polar researcher and skier

In the military 
Mariya Kuznetsova (pilot) (1918–1990), Soviet fighter pilot

In other areas 
Nataliya Kuznetsova-Lobanova (1947–1998), a Russian diver
Tatyana Kuznetsova (1941–2018), Soviet cosmonaut

See also 
2233 Kuznetsov, an asteroid named for Nikolai Ivanovich Kuznetsov (1911–1944)
Kuznetsov Design Bureau, a Soviet/Russian aircraft engine design bureau
Admiral Kuznetsov class aircraft carrier
Russian aircraft carrier Admiral Kuznetsov

Occupational surnames
Russian-language surnames